The 1894 Vanderbilt Commodores football team represented Vanderbilt University as an independent during the 1894 college football season. The team's head coach was Henry Worth Thornton, who only coached one season in that capacity at Vanderbilt.

Schedule

Season summary
The season started 2-1 and in the third game of the season against the Louisville Athletic Club when bad officiating call's against Vanderbilt lead to team captain W. J. Keller to pull his team off the field before the game was over in the second half and result in an 8-10 loss.

Louisville Athletic Club 
The game was away in Louisville with a crowd of over 500 persons. 
The Nashville American gave this report:

(Note at the time a touchdown was worth 4 points and the conversion was 2 points.)

The American added Coach Thornton's comments as:

The Louisville newspaper also revealed a letter to their newspaper as:

Vanderbilt went on to win the last 4 games to have a record of 7-1. This includes the first meeting of rivals Vanderbilt and Ole Miss.

References

External links 

 

Vanderbilt
Vanderbilt Commodores football seasons
Vanderbilt Commodores football